The euro (sign: €; code: EUR) is the official currency of the eurozone.

Euro may also refer to:

People
 Euro (rapper) (born 1992), a Dominican-American rapper

Europe
 Euro-, a prefix meaning "European"
 UEFA European Championship, an association football tournament
 Rugby League European Championship, a rugby league tournament
 European emission standards, acceptable limits for exhaust emissions of new vehicles sold in EU member states
 Association of European Operational Research Societies (EURO), a non-profit organization
 the World Health Organization's Regional Office for Europe

Other
 Euro, Western Australia, an abandoned town in Western Australia
 Common wallaroo, a species of macropod
 Eurodance, a genre of electronic dance music that originated in the late 1980s in Europe
 European-American Unity and Rights Organization (EURO), a white nationalist organization in the United States

See also
 Euros (disambiguation)
 EU (disambiguation)
 Europa (disambiguation)
 Europe (disambiguation)
 Evropa (disambiguation)